Desmocollin-2 is a protein that in humans is encoded by the DSC2 gene. Desmocollin-2 is a cadherin-type protein that functions to link adjacent cells together in specialized regions known as desmosomes. Desmocollin-2 is widely expressed, and is the only desmocollin isoform expressed in cardiac muscle, where it localizes to intercalated discs. Mutations in DSC2 have been causally linked to arrhythmogenic right ventricular cardiomyopathy.

Structure 

Desmocollin-2 is a calcium-dependent glycoprotein that is a member of the desmocollin subfamily of the cadherin superfamily. Three different posttranslational modifications (N-Glycosylations, O-Mannosylations and disulfide bridges) were present in the extracellular domain of desmocollin-2. The desmocollin family members are arranged as closely linked genes on human chromosome 18q12.1. Human DSC2 consists of greater than 32 kb of DNA and has 17 exons, with exon 16 being alternatively spliced and encoding distinct isoforms.  Desmocollin-2 contains five N-terminal extracellular domains, a transmembrane-spanning domain, and a C-terminal cytoplasmic tail. Desmocollin-2 binds to desmoglein family members through a calcium-dependent interaction with its extracellular domains, and to plakoglobin through its cytoplasmic tail. Desmocollin-2 is ubiquitously expressed in desmosomal tissues, such as skin epithelia, and is the only desmocollin isoform expressed in human cardiac muscle, where it localizes to desmosomes within intercalated discs.

Function 

Desmosomal cadherins, including the desmocollin family members and desmogleins, are found at desmosome cell-cell junctions and are required for cell adhesion and desmosome formation via interactions with their extracellular cadherin regions. Desmosomes function to anchor intermediate filaments at sites of strong adhesion, which undergo high mechanical stress, such as in cardiac muscle.
Desmocollins are integral components to desmosomes and studies have shown that in addition to tensile strength, desmocollins also function as molecular sensors and facilitators of signal transduction. Studies in zebrafish expressing a mutant desmocollin-2 have shed light on its function in the myocardium as a pivotal component for normal myocardial structure and function. Knockdown of desmcollin-2 caused malformations in desmosomal plaques and bradycardia, dilation of the ventricular chamber and reduced fractional shortening.

Clinical Significance 

Mutations in DSC2 are associated with arrhythmogenic right ventricular cardiomyopathy (ARVC), including mutations with a recessive inheritance. Mutations in DSC2 as well as other desmosomal genes are frequent in patients with advanced dilated cardiomyopathy that are undergoing cardiac transplantation.

Hallmark features of ARVC include enlargement of the right ventricle, replacement of right ventricular cardiomyocytes with fibrofatty deposits, electrocardiographic abnormalities, and arrhythmias. Biopsies from patients with ARVC consistently show abnormalities in intercalated discs, with decreased numbers of desmosomes and widening of intercellular gaps between adjacent cardiomyocytes, suggesting that this disease is a disease of intercalated discs. Studies investigating two heterozygous DSC2 mutations have shown that certain mutations in the N-terminal region can modify the subcellular localization of desmocollin-2 from the desmosomal plaque to the cytoplasm.

Interactions 
Desmocollin-2 has been shown to interact with:
 DSG2
 JUP

Animal Models 

 Transgenic mice with cardiac specific overexpression of desmocollin-2 develop severe cardiomyopathy.

References

Further reading

External links 
  GeneReviews/NCBI/NIH/UW entry on Arrhythmogenic Right Ventricular Dysplasia/Cardiomyopathy, Autosomal Dominant
  OMIM entries on Arrhythmogenic Right Ventricular Dysplasia/Cardiomyopathy, Autosomal Dominant